Flight 65 may refer to:

Aeroflot Flight 65, crashed on 17 February 1966
Florida Commuter Airlines Flight 65, crashed on September 12, 1980

0065